Marshall Kent (October 6, 1908 – January 15, 1985) was an American television and film actor who appeared in 30 television series or films between 1956 and 1977.  He was best known for his role as "Doc" in the 1958 spoof of Gunsmoke presented as an episode of Maverick starring James Garner entitled "Gun-Shy."

Career 
Kent appeared in various other television series including Dragnet with Jack Webb, Perry Mason with Raymond Burr, The Deputy with Henry Fonda, The Gray Ghost  with Broderick Crawford, Dennis the Menace with Robert Young, Room 222, The Wonderful World of Disney and Little House on the Prairie.  He was also a supporting player in films including The Decks Ran Red with James Mason and Dorothy Dandridge, Ring of Fire with David Janssen, and The Last Voyage with Robert Stack and Dorothy Malone.

Filmography

Film

Television

External links 

Rotten Tomatoes profile

1908 births
1985 deaths
American male television actors
American male film actors
20th-century American male actors